Theodore Nicholas Gill (March 21, 1837 – September 25, 1914) was an American ichthyologist, mammalogist, malacologist and librarian.

Career
Born and educated in New York City under private tutors, Gill early showed interest in natural history. He was associated with J. Carson Brevoort in the arrangement of the latter's entomological and ichthyological collections before going to Washington D.C. in 1863 to work at the Smithsonian Institution. He catalogued mammals, fishes and mollusks most particularly although maintaining proficiency in other orders of animals. He was librarian at the Smithsonian and also senior assistant to the Library of Congress. He was elected as a member of the American Philosophical Society in 1867.

Gill was professor of zoology at George Washington University. He was also a member of the Megatherium Club at the Smithsonian Institution in Washington, D.C.  Fellow members frequently mocked him for his vanity. He was president of the American Association for the Advancement of Science in 1897.

He was a founding member of the Cosmos Club.

Publications
Besides 400 separate papers on scientific subjects, his major publications include:

 1871.  Arrangements of the Families of Mollusks 49 pp.
 1872. Arrangement of the Families of Mammals 98 pp.
 1872. Arrangement of the Families of Fishes
 1875. Catalogue of the Fishes of the East Coast of North America
 1882. Bibliography of the Fishes of the Pacific of the United States to the End of 1879
 Reports on Zoology for the annual volumes of the Smithsonian Institution from 1879

See also
:Category:Taxa named by Theodore Gill

References

Abbott, R.T., and M.E. Young (eds.). 1973. American Malacologists: A national register of professional and amateur malacologists and private shell collectors and biographies of early American mollusk workers born between 1618 and 1900. American Malacologists, Falls Church, Virginia. Consolidated/Drake Press, Philadelphia. 494 pp.
Obituary in The Auk, October 1914, Number 4.
Appleton's Cyclopedia of American Biography, edited by James Grant Wilson, John Fiske and Stanley L. Klos. Six volumes, New York: D. Appleton and Company, 1887–1889

External links 

 Smithsonian biography of Theodore Gill
A pdf biography of T.N. Gill at the National Academy of Sciences webstire

American ichthyologists
American malacologists
American mammalogists
American taxonomists
American librarians
1837 births
1914 deaths
Scientists from New York City
George Washington University faculty